Bound is a surname. Notable people with the surname include:

 Franklin Bound (1829–1910), American politician
 John Bound, American labor economist
 Matthew Bound (born 1972), English footballer
 Mensun Bound (born 1953), marine archaeologist from the Falkland Islands

See also
 Bounds (surname)